KK Super Mart is a convenience store chain in Malaysia. Established in 2001, it is named after its founder, Datuk Seri Dr. KK Chai. The first location of KK Supermart occupied the ground floor of a shoplot at Kuchai Entrepreneurs Park in Kuala Lumpur with an initial capital of only RM 60,000. 

It started out by focusing mainly in the Klang Valley region, Putrajaya, Cyberjaya, KLIA2, Malacca and Seremban. KK Super Mart also has branches in other countries such as Nepal and India. In 2019, KK Super Mart had launched its first outlet at a LRT station which is the Kelana Jaya LRT station.

The retailer currently operates 650 outlets with rapidly expanding by average 10 stores a month. The company entered into a partnership in 2019 with UniPin, an Indonesian payment gateway focused on online gaming.

In July 2022. KK Supermart signs MOU with GS25, a leading convenience store in South Korea with over 16,000 outlets worldwide. Following Vietnam and Mongolia, Malaysia is the third country that GS25 has expanded into.

According to their statement, KK Supermart is targeting to open first GS25 in third quarter of 2023 and 500 outlets in the next 5 years. They also will open franchisee opportunity to local business owner who interested to open their own GS25 outlet.

References 

2001 establishments in Malaysia
Convenience stores

Malaysian brands